Hyperolius viridigulosus is a species of frog in the family Hyperoliidae.
It is found in Ivory Coast and Ghana.
Its natural habitat is subtropical or tropical moist lowland forests.
It is threatened by habitat loss.

References

viridigulosus
Taxa named by Arne Schiøtz
Amphibians described in 1967
Taxonomy articles created by Polbot